GAIS can refer to:

 GAIS, the football department of a Swedish sports club based in Göteborg
 GAIS Bandy, the bandy department of a Swedish sports club based in Göteborg
 German-American International School, now Alto International School, in Menlo Park, California

See also
 Gais, Switzerland, a gemeinde in the Canton of Appenzell Ausserrhoden
 Gais, South Tyrol, a municipality in South Tyrol